is a Japanese actress and gravure idol who is represented by the talent agency, Sense Up. She is nicknamed .

Biography
In 2007, Nakajima was elected as a finalist on Miss Magazine 2007. She was awarded the "Miss Shūkan Shōnen Magazine" prize in July.

On July 15, Nakajima has been carried out in the unveiling event of Miss Magazine 2007 at Sunshine City, Fountain Square, Ikebukuro, Tokyo. In the same event, Miss Magazine uniforms are passed, which were formally subscribed to the Miss Magazine football team. Her uniform number is 7 (25 until February 2009). At the uniform on the back it is written as "Eye-ri". She graduated from Kangawa Prefectural Ikuta East High School.

Filmography

TV series

Films

References

External links
Official profile 
Sponichi Idol Report Airi Nakajima 

Japanese gravure idols
1990 births
Living people
People from Kanagawa Prefecture